The Audenis C2 was a two-seat fighter biplane, designed and built in France during 1916. Probably powered by a  Clerget 9B 9-cylinder rotary engine, the C2 had equal span single bay biplane wings with the lower mainplane set well below the fuselage attached by the rear undercarriage struts and a pair of struts at the leading edge. The undercarriage was of conventional tailskid configuration with the mainwheel axle attached to the fuselage by V-struts. Pilot and gunner were seated in individual cockpits with the pilot under the centre-section and the gunner aft of the wings, provided with a single fixed Vickers machine-gun fired by the pilot and a machine-gun on a ring in the rear cockpit. Development of the C2 did not continue after initial flight trials.

Specifications (C2)

References

Biplanes
Aircraft first flown in 1916
Rotary-engined aircraft
Single-engined tractor aircraft